Italian singer Giorgia has released twelve studio albums, two compilation albums, three live albums (including one as a featured artist), one extended plays, sixty-one singles (including ten as a featured artist), one video albums and thirty music videos.

Albums

Studio albums

Compilation

Live albums

Extended plays

Singles

As lead artist

As featured artist

Videography

Video albums

Featured video albums

Music videos

References

External links
 Giorgia discography at her official site

Pop music discographies
Discographies of Italian artists